Gooische Vrouwen 2 is a 2014 Dutch film directed by Will Koopman. The film is the sequel of the 2011 film Gooische Vrouwen and both films are based on the Gooische Vrouwen television series. The film was released on 4 December 2014 and went on to become the best-visited film in the Netherlands in 2014. The film won the Golden Film award after having sold 100,000 tickets and on 28 December 2014 also the Diamond Film for reaching 1 million tickets. It went on to have more than 2 million admissions, making it one of the ten most popular Dutch films of all time. In 2015, the film won the Rembrandt Award.

Cast 

 Linda de Mol as Cheryl Morero
 Tjitske Reidinga as Claire van Kampen
 Susan Visser as Anouk Verschuur
 Lies Visschedijk as Roelien Grootheeze
 Peter Paul Muller as Martin Morero
 Leopold Witte as Evert Lodewijkx
 Derek de Lint as Dokter Rossi
 Alex Klaasen as Yari
 Beppie Melissen as Tante Cor
 Elise van 't Laar as Daphne
 Stefan Rokebrand as Alfons
 Djédjé Apali as Komo
 Kees Hulst as Olivier Grootheeze
 Reinout Scholten van Aschat as Roderick Lodewijkx
 Priscilla Knetemann as Louise Lodewijkx

References

External links 
 

2014 films
2010s Dutch-language films
Dutch comedy films
Films based on television series
Films shot in the Netherlands
Films set in the Netherlands